Business reporting or enterprise reporting refers to both "the public reporting of operating and financial data by a business enterprise," and "the regular provision of information to decision-makers within an organization to support them in their work." It is a fundamental part of the larger movement towards improved business intelligence and knowledge management. Implementation often involves extract, transform, and load (ETL) procedures in coordination with a data warehouse and then using one or more reporting tools. Reports can be distributed in print form, via email or accessed via a corporate intranet.

With the expansion of information technology there has been an increase in the production of unified reports which join different views of an organization in one place. This reporting process involves querying data sources with different logical models to produce a human-readable report. For example, a decision maker may need to query a human resources databases and a capital improvements databases to show how efficiently space is being used across an entire corporation.
Reporting can also be used for verification and cross-checks. Audit teams like FINRA and SEC adhere to reports for all business firms. Standard Business Reporting is a group of international programs instigated by a number of governments with the end of make business the center when it comes to managing business-to-government reporting obligations.

Business reports can be presented in many forms, including digital or physical representations. Digital reports can be interactive and viewed through a standard web browser 
or other software, or more statically represented as for example in a PDF file, or printed on paper. A paginated report is a report which may be formatted to be more suitable for printing to paper or PDF, including specification of physical measurements which matches the paper, page splits and how data is split across multiple pages.

See also
Data reporting
Operational reporting

References

Business intelligence terms